Encope is a genus of echinoderms belonging to the family Mellitidae.

The species of this genus are found in America.

Species:

Encope aberrans 
Encope angelensis 
Encope annectans 
Encope arcensis 
Encope borealis 
Encope californica 
Encope carmenensis 
Encope chaneyi 
Encope chilensis 
Encope ciae 
Encope emarginata 
Encope falconensis 
Encope galapagensis 
Encope gatunensis 
Encope grandis 
Encope homala 
Encope kugleri 
Encope loretoensis 
Encope macrophora 
Encope megatrema 
Encope michelini 
Encope michoacanensis 
Encope micropora 
Encope pacifica 
Encope peruviana 
Encope platytata 
Encope scrippsae 
Encope secoensis 
Encope shepherdi 
Encope sverdrupi 
Encope tatetlaensis 
Encope tenuis 
Encope vonderschmitti 
Encope wiedenmayeri

References

Echinoidea genera
Mellitidae